Llanberis (LLR) railway station is the southern terminus of the Llanberis Lake Railway (LLR), located in Llanberis, Gwynedd, Wales. The line and station primarily serve tourists and railway enthusiasts.

Most of the LLR was laid around 1970 on the trackbed of the closed and lifted Padarn Railway. For thirty years the new line's southern terminus was Gilfach Ddu (LLR), situated a short distance south of the site of the Padarn Railway's former workmen's station, also named Gilfach Ddu. In 2003 a wholly new extension was opened south westwards, with Llanberis (LLR) station as the line's new southern terminus.

The single platform station stands opposite Llanberis (SMR) station, the lower terminus of the Snowdon Mountain Railway, and not far from the site of the long-closed Llanberis standard gauge station.

References

Sources

External links

 The station and line in Llanberis Lake Railway
 Edwardian 6" map showing the station site, overlain with modern satellite images and maps in National Library of Scotland
 The station and line in Rail Map Online
 Images of the station and line in Yahoo

Railway stations in Great Britain opened in 2003
Llanberis
Heritage railway stations in Gwynedd
Railway stations built for UK heritage railways